Rear Admiral (retired) Upul De Silva, RWP, RSP, USP, psc was a Sri Lankan naval officer who served as Chief of Staff of the Sri Lanka Navy. Silva also holds the office as Commander, Western Naval Area. Prior to this appointment, he was Deputy Chief of Staff in Sri Lankan Navy. He also served as the Commandant of Volunteer Naval Force at the Volunteer Naval Force Headquarters.

Early life and education 
Upul De Silva educated at Bandarawela Central College. After join Sri Lanka Navy, he has had his basic training at Naval and Maritime Academy in Trincomalee, then completed Sub Lieutenant Technical Course in India. Admiral Silva completed his Command and Staff Course at Naval Staff College, US Naval War College, RI, USA. He completed the Defence Management Course in India, the Group Commander Course in China and achieved his MS Degree in Defence and Strategic Studies in National Defence University, China.

Career 
He joined the Sri Lanka Navy in 1986 as an Officer Cadet, to the Executive branch. He was promoted to Rear Admiral in 2019 from Commodore. On 22 June 2022 he was appointed as Chief of Staff, Sri Lanka Navy by the President and Commander-in-Chief of Armed Forces of Sri Lanka, Gotabaya Rajapaksa. And he went retirement on 9 July, 2022.

References 

Sri Lankan rear admirals
Sinhalese military personnel
Naval and Maritime Academy graduates

Living people

Year of birth missing (living people)